Giannou is a surname. Notable people with the surname include: 

Apostolos Giannou (born 1990), Greek-Australian footballer
Chris Giannou (born 1949), Greek-Canadian war surgeon
Eleni Giannou (born 1993), Cypriot footballer
Kleopas Giannou (born 1982), Greek footballer